Brett Cooper (born July 2, 1987) is an American mixed martial artist currently competing in the Welterweight division. A professional competitor since 2005, he has also competed for Bellator, PFL, Affliction, Absolute Championship Berkut, IFL, KSW, and Jungle Fight.

Background
Cooper was born in Los Angeles, California, and has lived in Long Beach, California his whole life.

Mixed martial arts career

Early career
Cooper made his professional debut in 2005 when he was 17 years old and won via TKO. He held a record of 5–4 with a split decision win over future EliteXC and Strikeforce veteran Conor Heun before facing future UFC and Strikeforce veteran Jason Von Flue. Cooper won the bout via TKO and then made his IFL debut in his next fight against future UFC veteran Rory Markham. Cooper won again via TKO against the Miletich Fighting Systems product and followed this up with another win to bring his record to 8-4 and making his debut in Affliction.

Affliction
On January 24, 2009, Cooper fought Patrick Speight at Affliction: Day of Reckoning who he defeated by knockout.

Bellator Fighting Championships

Season Two Welterweight Tournament
Cooper fought Steve Carl as the main event at Bellator XV where is lost by split decision in the quarterfinals of the Bellator Season Two Welterweight Tournament.

Non-tournament bouts
In 2010, Cooper moved up to the Middleweight division.  He fought Matt Major at Bellator XXIX where he won by second-round technical knockout.

In 2011, Cooper fought three times for Bellator in non-tournament bouts.  He faced Alexander Shlemenko at Bellator XLIV where he lost by unanimous decision. Cooper fought Valdir Araujo at Bellator L where he won by third-round technical knockout.  Finally, Cooper fought Jared Hess at Bellator LVIII where he won by unanimous decision.

In 2012, Cooper faced Darryl Cobb at Bellator LXXX where he won by unanimous decision.

Season Eight Middleweight Tournament
Cooper fought Norman Paraisy at Bellator LXXXIX in the quarterfinals of the Bellator Season Eight Middleweight Tournament. He won the fight via unanimous decision.  Cooper faced Dan Cramer in the semifinals at Bellator 92.  Despite losing the first two rounds, Cooper rallied to win via TKO in the third round.  He faced Doug Marshall in the finals and lost via knockout in the first round.

Despite losing in the finals, Cooper was chosen as a replacement for Marshall when his former opponent injured his hand.  Having earlier lost to Shlemenko in 2011, Cooper had the rematch with him for the Middleweight title on September 7, 2013, at Bellator 98. He lost the back-and-forth fight via unanimous decision.

Season Ten Middleweight Tournament
In March 2014, Cooper entered the Bellator Season 10 Middleweight tournament.  He faced UFC veteran Kendall Grove in the semifinals at Bellator 114.  After losing the first round, Cooper rallied back to win the bout via knockout in the second round.  He faced Brandon Halsey in the tournament final at Bellator 122 and lost via submission.

Non-tournament bouts
Stepping in as a replacement for an injured James Irvin, Cooper was set to face Brian Rogers at Bellator 125 on September 19, 2014. However, a foot injury forced Cooper out of the bout, he was replaced with promotional newcomer Rafael Carvalho.

Absolute Championship Berkut
Cooper signed with ACB and faced Beslan Isaev at ACB 43: Battle on Sura on 20 August 2016. He won by unanimous decision.

Cooper beat second Chechen super star Aslanbek Saidov at ACB 50: Rasulov vs. Goltsov on December 18, 2016. He won the fight via TKO in the third round and became a new ACB welterweight Champion.

Cooper faced Mukhamed Berkhamov at ACB 67: Cooper vs. Berkhamov on August 19, 2017. He lost the fight via knockout in the second round and lost ACB welterweight title.

Cooper faced Saraf Davlatmurodov at ACB 76: Cooper vs. Davlatmurodov on December 9, 2017. He won the fight via TKO in the second round.

Cooper was scheduled to face Beslan Isaev at ACA 116: Froes vs Balaev. However, after making weight, he consulted with his lawyers and decided to refuse fighting because of the U.S. Department of Treasury and Great Britain's sanctions policy against Kadyrov and any organization owned by him, this including Absolute Championship Akhmat. Under these sanctions, it is illegal for any US citizen to do business with any of these entities, meaning that all American fighters could face fines or jail time if they fight for the organization.

Professional Fighters League 
Cooper was scheduled to face Nikolay Aleksakhin on August 13, 2021, at PFL 7. However, on August 4, it was announced that Aleksakhin had to pull out of the match-up and was replaced by Tyler Hill. Cooper won the bout in the first round via knockout.

PFL season 2022 
Cooper faced Rory MacDonald on May 6, 2022, at PFL 3. Cooper lost the bout in the first round via rear-naked choke.

Cooper faced Ray Cooper III on July 1, 2022, at PFL 6. He lost the bout via TKO stoppage 24 seconds into the bout.

Personal life
Cooper is married and has a daughter.

Championships and accomplishments
Absolute Championship Berkut
Welterweight championship (one time)
Bellator Fighting Championships
Bellator Season 8 Middleweight Tournament Runner-Up

Mixed martial arts record

|-
|Loss
|align=center|28–17
|Ray Cooper III
|TKO (knees and punches)
|PFL 6
|
|align=center|1
|align=center|0:24
|Atlanta, Georgia, United States
|
|-
|Loss
|align=center|28–16
|Rory MacDonald
|Submission (rear-naked choke)
|PFL 3
|
|align=center|1
|align=center|2:23
|Arlington, Texas, United States
|
|-
|Win
|align=center|28–15
|Tyler Hill
|KO (punches)
|PFL 7 
|
|align=center|1
|align=center|2:32
|Hollywood, Florida, United States
|
|- 
|Win
|align=center|27–15
|Alexey Efremov
|DQ (illegal knee) 
|ACA 103: Yagshimuradov vs. Butorin
|
|align=center|1
|align=center|1:02
|Saint Petersburg, Russia
|
|-
|-
|Loss
|align=center|26–15
|Sharaf Davlatmurodov
|TKO (punches)
|ACA 99: Bagov vs. Khaliev 
|
|align=center|2
|align=center|0:24
|Moscow, Russia
|
|- 
|-
|Loss
|align=center|26–14
|Salamu Abdurakhmanov
|Submission (anaconda choke)
|ACA 95: Tumenov vs. Abdulaev 
|
|align=center|1
|align=center|2:46
|Moscow, Russia
|
|- 
|Win
|align=center|26–13
|Azamat Amagov
|Decision (majority)
|ACA 91: Agujev vs. Silvério
|
|align=center|3
|align=center|5:00
|Grozny, Russia
|
|-
|Win
|align=center|25–13
|André Santos
|KO (punches)
|ACB 82: Silva vs. Kolobegov
|
|align=center|1
|align=center|1:42
|São Paulo, Brazil
|
|-
| Win
| align=center| 24–13
|  Sharaf Davlatmurodov
| TKO (punches)
| ACB 76: Young Eagles 23
| 
| align=center|2 
| align=center|3:29 
| Gold Coast, Australia
| 
|-
| Loss
| align=center| 23–13
| Mukhamed Berkhamov
| KO (punches)
|ACB 67: Cooper vs. Berkhamov
|
|align=center| 2
|align=center| 0:32
|Grozny, Russia
|Lost ACB Welterweight Championship.
|-
| Win
| align=center| 23–12
| Aslambek Saidov
| TKO (punches)
| |ACB 50: Stormbringer
| 
| align=center| 3
| align=center| 0:27
| St.Petersburg, Russia
| Won vacant ACB Welterweight Championship.
|-
|-
| Win
| align=center| 22–12
| Beslan Isaev
| Decision (unanimous)
| |ACB 43: Battle of the Sura
| 
| align=center| 3
| align=center| 5:00
|  Penza, Russia
|Return to Welterweight.
|-
| Loss
| align=center| 21–12
| Maiquel Falcao
| KO (punch)
| KSW 32: Road to Wembley
| 
| align=center| 1
| align=center| 0:59
|  London, England
| 
|-
| Win
| align=center| 21–11
| Jessie Glass
| TKO (punches)
| Gladiator Challenge: California State Championship Series
| 
| align=center| 1
| align=center| 2:11
|  San Jacinto, California, United States
| 
|-
| Loss
| align=center| 20–11
| Mamed Khalidov
| Decision (unanimous)
| KSW 29: Reload
| 
| align=center| 3
| align=center| 5:00
| Kraków, Poland
| 
|-
| Loss
| align=center| 20–10
| Brandon Halsey
| Submission (armbar)
| Bellator 122
| 
| align=center| 1
| align=center| 2:09 
| Temecula, California, United States
| 
|-
| Win
| align=center| 20–9
| Kendall Grove
| KO (punches)
| Bellator 114
| 
| align=center| 2
| align=center| 3:33
| West Valley City, Utah, United States
| 
|-
| Loss
| align=center| 19–9
| Alexander Shlemenko
| Decision (unanimous)
| Bellator 98
| 
| align=center| 5
| align=center| 5:00
| Uncasville, Connecticut, United States
| 
|-
| Loss
| align=center| 19–8
| Doug Marshall
| KO (punches)
| Bellator 95
| 
| align=center| 1
| align=center| 3:39
| Atlantic City, New Jersey, United States
| 
|-
| Win
| align=center| 19–7
| Dan Cramer
| TKO (punches)
| Bellator 92
| 
| align=center| 3
| align=center| 3:19
| Temecula, California, United States
| 
|-
| Win
| align=center| 18–7
| Norman Paraisy
| Decision (unanimous)
| Bellator 89
| 
| align=center| 3
| align=center| 5:00
| Charlotte, North Carolina, United States
| 
|-
| Win
| align=center| 17–7
| Darryl Cobb
| Decision (unanimous)
| Bellator 80
| 
| align=center| 3
| align=center| 5:00
| Hollywood, Florida, United States
| 
|-
| Win
| align=center| 16–7
| Jared Hess
| Decision (unanimous)
| Bellator 58
| 
| align=center| 3
| align=center| 5:00
| Hollywood, Florida, United States
| 
|-
| Win
| align=center| 15–7
| Joe Doerksen
| TKO (punches)
| Score Fighting Series 2
| 
| align=center| 1
| align=center| 3:55
| Hamilton, Ontario, Canada
| 
|-
| Win
| align=center| 14–7
| Valdir Araujo
| TKO (punches)
| Bellator 50
| 
| align=center| 3
| align=center| 0:35
| Hollywood, Florida, United States
| 
|-
| Loss
| align=center| 13–7
| Alexander Shlemenko
| Decision (unanimous)
| Bellator 44
| 
| align=center| 3
| align=center| 5:00
| Atlantic City, New Jersey, United States
| 
|-
| Win
| align=center| 13–6
| Keith Berry
| KO (punches)
| Lords of the Cage
| 
| align=center| 1
| align=center| 0:10
| Temecula, California, United States
| 
|-
| Win
| align=center| 12–6
| Matt Major
| TKO (punches)
| Bellator 29
| 
| align=center| 2
| align=center| 1:27
| Milwaukee, Wisconsin, United States
| Middleweight debut.
|-
| Loss
| align=center| 11–6
| Steve Carl
| Decision (split)
| Bellator 15
| 
| align=center| 3
| align=center| 5:00
| Uncasville, Connecticut, United States
| Bellator Season Two Welterweight Tournament Quarterfinal.
|-
| Win
| align=center| 11–5
| Sérgio Moraes
| KO (punch)
| Jungle Fight 16
| 
| align=center| 2
| align=center| 5:00
| Rio de Janeiro, Brazil
| 
|-
| Loss
| align=center| 10–5
| Waachiim Spiritwolf
| TKO (punches)
| Fight Force International: Ultimate Chaos
| 
| align=center| 1
| align=center| 3:41
| Biloxi, Mississippi, United States
| 
|-
| Win
| align=center| 10–4
| Joe Cronin
| TKO (doctor stoppage)
| Call To Arms 1
| 
| align=center| 1
| align=center| 1:17
| Ontario, California, United States
| 
|-
| Win
| align=center| 9–4
| Patrick Speight
| TKO (punches)
| Affliction: Day of Reckoning
| 
| align=center| 2
| align=center| 4:10
| Anaheim, California, United States
| 
|-
| Win
| align=center| 8–4
| Dusty Arden
| KO (punches)
| PureCombat 4: Bombs Away
| 
| align=center| 2
| align=center| 0:39
| Visalia, California, United States
| 
|-
| Win
| align=center| 7–4
| Rory Markham
| TKO (punches)
| IFL: World Grand Prix Finals
| 
| align=center| 2
| align=center| 1:15
| Uncasville, Connecticut, United States
| 
|-
| Win
| align=center| 6–4
| Jason Von Flue
| TKO (punches)
| PureCombat 1: From the Ashes
| 
| align=center| 1
| align=center| N/A
| Visalia, California, United States
| 
|-
| Win
| align=center| 5–4
| Vince Guzman
| Submission (anaconda choke)
| Shooto: The Arrival: This is Shooto
| 
| align=center| 1
| align=center| 1:58
| Irvine, California, United States
| 
|-
| Loss
| align=center| 4–4
| Toby Grear
| Decision
| Total Fighting Alliance 6: War on the Shore
| 
| align=center| 3
| align=center| 5:00
| Santa Monica, California, United States
| 
|-
| Win
| align=center| 4–3
| Jesse Romero
| Submission (guillotine choke)
| Total Fighting Alliance 5: Conflict on the Coast
| 
| align=center| 2
| align=center| 2:09
| Santa Monica, California, United States
| 
|-
| Win
| align=center| 3–3
| Conor Heun
| Decision (split)
| Total Fighting Alliance 4: Fight Night, Fright Night
| 
| align=center| 3
| align=center| 5:00
| Carson, California, United States
| 
|-
| Loss
| align=center| 2–3
| Jesse Romero
| Submission (rear-naked choke)
| Universal Above Ground Fighting: Kaos on the Kampus
| 
| align=center| 2
| align=center| 3:52
| Los Angeles, California, United States
| 
|-
| Loss
| align=center| 2–2
| Bryan Joplin
| Decision (unanimous)
| California Xtreme Fighting 1
| 
| align=center| 3
| align=center| 5:00
| Upland, California, United States
| 
|-
| Loss
| align=center| 2–1
| Ed Ratcliff
| KO (spinning heel kick)
| Total Combat 12
| 
| align=center| 2
| align=center| N/A
| Tijuana, Baja California, Mexico
| 
|-
| Win
| align=center| 2–0
| Jesse Romero
| Decision (unanimous)
| World FC: Rumble at the Ramada
| 
| align=center| 3
| align=center| N/A
| Norwalk, California, United States
| 
|-
| Win
| align=center| 1–0
| Cody Culkin
| TKO (punches)
| Total Combat 10
| 
| align=center| 1
| align=center| 1:38
| San Diego, California, United States
|

References

External links
 

1987 births
Living people
American male mixed martial artists
Middleweight mixed martial artists
Sportspeople from Long Beach, California